Gérard de Courcelles (21 May 1889, Paris - 2 July 1927, Paris) was a French racing driver who won the 24 Hours of Le Mans for the French Lorraine-Dietrich automobile company, along with teammate André Rossignol.

Career
De Courcelles was a decorated fighter pilot during the First World War, receiving several citations and the Médaille militaire.

De Courcelles began his career driving cyclecars in Grands Prix, but was eventually hired by Lorraine-Dietrich to enter the inaugural 24 Hours. The following year the two drove separate cars, with De Courcelles assigned to Marcel Mongin. Rossignol however, and new teammate Robert Bloch, went on to win the event once again, with De Courcelles and Mongin in second.

De Courcelles died on 2 July 1927 due to an accident during a Formule Libre race supporting the Grand Prix de l'ACF.

Racing record

Complete 24 Hours of Le Mans results

External links 
Gérard de Courcelles at racingsportscars.com.

1889 births
1927 deaths
French racing drivers
24 Hours of Le Mans drivers
24 Hours of Le Mans winning drivers
Racing drivers who died while racing